Alfons “Ali” Mitgutsch (21 August 1935 – 10 January 2022) was a German author of picture books and a professional advertising Illustrator. He was known as the father of the Wimmelbilder books.

Life and career
Mitgutsch was born in Munich, Bavaria, Germany, on 21 August 1935. As a child the Mitgutsch family was evacuated to Allgäu in World War II due to bombing in Munich. After returning to Munich he trained at Graphical Academy as a lithographer.

In the 1960s, Kurt Seelmann, a child psychologist inspired him to create a special kind of picture book for children. Mitgutsch became famous for his Wimmelbilder-books. These books show everyday scenes in a single painting across the pages on top. Rundherum in meiner Stadt (Around in my city) released in 1968 is the first book in the series.

Mitgutsch lived in Munich, the city inspired his paintings. He died in Munich from complications of pneumonia on 10 January 2022, at the age of 86.

Awards 
 1960 nominated for Deutscher Jugendliteraturpreis for Pepes Hut
 1961 nominated for Deutscher Jugendliteraturpreis for Ulus abenteuerliche Reise zum Nordlicht
 1962 nominated for Deutscher Jugendliteraturpreis for Nico findet einen Schatz
 1969 Deutscher Jugendbuchpreis for the picture book Rundherum in meiner Stadt 
 1971 nominated for Deutscher Jugendliteraturpreis for Bei uns im Dorf
 1972 nominated for Deutscher Jugendliteraturpreis for Komm mit ans Wasser
 1978 Hans Christian Andersen Award for Rund ums Schiff (Around the ship)
 2003 Schwabing Art Award
 2016 Ernst-Hoferichter-Preis
 2018 Verdienstkreuz am Bande der Bundesrepublik Deutschland for a new Genre 
 2019 Oberbayerischer Kulturpreis

Publications

Picture books 
 Pepes Hut (1959)
 Ulus abenteuerliche Reise (1960 im Münchener Bilderbuch Verlag)
 Nico findet einen Schatz (1961)
 Rundherum in meiner Stadt (1968 Deutscher Jugendliteraturpreis)
 Bei uns im Dorf (1970) (In our Village)
 Komm mit ans Wasser (1971)
 Auf dem Lande 
 Rund ums Rad (1975)
 Rund ums Schiff (1977)
 Hier in den Bergen (1979)
 Was wimmelt denn da (What's teeming here)
 Die Hexe und die sieben Fexe
 Unsere große Stadt (1988)
 Ritterbuch (Knightsbook)
 Engel in der Werkstatt
 Aufbruch der Weihnachtsmänner
 Mein schönstes Wimmelbilderbuch
 Das große Piraten-Wimmelbuch
 Alle spielen mit
 Mein riesengroßes Piraten-Wimmelbuch
 Mein riesengroßes Wimmel-Suchbuch (2010)
 Fizzel baut eine Burg (Fizzel is building a castle), Otto Maier, Ravensburg,1992, Reihe Kleine Ravensburger
 Vom Korn zum Brot (From grain to bread)

Further reading 
 
  
 rossipotti.de Biography and catalogue of works (in German).
 Ali Mitgutsch erzählt eine Episode aus seiner Jugend Schwabinger Straßengang, Ali Mitgutsch recounting some childhood memories (in German).
 In einer eigenen Welt, interview with Ali Mitgutsch, in: Der Freitag, December 23, 2011 (in German).

References 

1935 births
2022 deaths 
Deaths from pneumonia in Germany
German illustrators
German children's writers
Writers from Munich
Recipients of the Cross of the Order of Merit of the Federal Republic of Germany